AlDhafiri or AlDhafeer is an ancient Arabian tribe, that goes back to Tayy. It used to control the entirety of Najd from around 1300 to 1590. They were known as warriors of the Arabian region 700 years ago, united and always together despite their huge numbers. Starting in the 1300s, Al-Dhafeer resided around Medina, close to Mecca. Now most of the tribe lives in Kingdom of Saudi Arabia taking positions such as professors, politicians, scholars, doctors and engineers. They also live in Kuwait, United Arab Emirates, Bahrain, Iraq, and Qatar.

Division
Nowadays the tribe is divided into two parts:

 Alsamada Sheikh : Aba tharaa - 7 divisions:
 Al Thraan
 Al Maleem
 Al Madeen
 Al Jawasim
 AL Alajanat
 Al Askar
 Al Oraef

 Albotoon Sheikh : Bin suwait - 3 divisions:
 Al suwait
 Al saeed
 Bani Hussein

References

Tribes of Arabia
Semitic-speaking peoples
History of the Arabian Peninsula
Tayy
Tribes of Iraq
Tribes of Kuwait
Tribes of the United Arab Emirates
Tribes of Saudi Arabia